CrowdOptic, Inc. (known as CrowdOptic) is a privately held  San Francisco-based medical technology company founded in 2011. CrowdOptic, led by CEO Jon Fisher, is best known for its augmented reality technology and triangulation algorithms used in medicine, sports, and government that gathers and analyzes data from smart devices based on where they are pointed to identify areas of interest. As of 2016, CrowdOptic remains the only patented solution for wearables like Google Glass and Sony SmartEyeGlass.

History 
CrowdOptic was founded in 2011 by Jon Fisher, Jeff Broderick, Doug Van Blaricom, and Alex Malinovsky. The company analyzes data from mobile devices to identify hot spot activity and connects Google Glass footage to live video feeds. The technology is in use by professional sports, medicine, and government including for emergency response, fire and public-safety workers.

CrowdOptic's investors include Silicon Valley Bank, John Elway, Eric Yuan, and Ronnie Lott. The company has raised $5 million in funding.

In 2015, the company was named one of the most well-established of the 10 current Glass for Work partners. In July 2015, 9 To 5 Google announced that the CrowdOptic was in acquisition talks with a Fortune 500 firm.

In 2016, CrowdOptic released its first in-house developed hardware product, the CrowdOptic Eye, a device that streams video through the company's video streaming stack with the push of one button.

In October 2016, CrowdOptic launched Field App through the Google Play Store to "triangulate on a point of interest and broadcast its GPS location to a command center with live-video verification." The application uses a cloud-based system, GPS, compass and live video and smart sensor data to coordinate emergency responders, firemen and police.

In August 2017, the Houston Chronicle reported that Hewlett Packard Enterprise and CrowdOptic reached a deal to combine CrowdOptic's augmented reality platform and triangulation algorithms and Hewlett Packard servers in its internet of things lab in Houston, Texas. Following a partnership with National BioSkills Labs, CrowdOptic's technology is deployed by Medtronic, HPE, and Zoom.

Applications
The company is a founding certified Google Glass partner with its technology also in use by Sony, Vuzix and Microsoft. CrowdOptic develops algorithms which let smartphones and wearables live-stream from locations such as hospital operating rooms or sports stadiums.

Sports
In 2014, CrowdOptic partnered with the Sacramento Kings to develop an alternative view of basketball games using Google Glass. The company broadcast Google Glass video footage from the perspective of players and cheerleaders on the Jumbotron and mobile devices. This technology was also implemented during warm-ups by the Stanford basketball team.

The company also partnered with the Indiana Pacers to use the technology. The footage was broadcast from the video feeds of team employees wearing Google Glass. CrowdOptic has agreements with the Philadelphia Eagles, and Sony for SmartEyeGlass to use the technology.

In August 2014, CrowdOptic partnered with NASCAR's International Speedway Corporation to broadcast live racing and behind-the-scenes footage from Google Glass.

In 2016, CrowdOptic deployed with the Denver Broncos at the AFC Championship game in Denver, Colorado and at the Super Bowl 50 at Levi's Stadium in the San Francisco Bay Area.

Medicine
In June 2014, CrowdOptic announced a partnership with the University of California, San Francisco to stream procedures by UCSF Department of Orthopaedic Surgery faculty. The company announced in July 2014 that ProTransport-1, a California-based medical transport provider, would install Google Glass in its ambulances. Google Glass uses CrowdOptic's software to send a live video feed from an ambulance to a destination hospital.

CrowdOptic also partnered with Stanford University Medical School. The software is used to live stream surgeries to doctors and medical students wearing Google Glass. The data from the live stream is owned by Stanford University. In 2017 the company debuted a live-streaming platform for medical practitioner training at National Bioskills Laboratories in San Francisco.

Government

CrowdOptic's technology has been deployed with NASA to enhance the launch and landing of a lunar lander and provide live streaming for incident response. In 2016, the company paired with Solford Industries to market a low-bandwidth live-streaming device integrated with a conventional firefighter helmet in use by fire departments, police and first responders in both the United States and China. In September 2016 CrowdOptic also deployed augmented reality for United States Special Operations Command for field personnel to report to central command about specific targets including the  GPS location and a live stream of the target using CrowdOptic's triangulation algorithms.

In November 2016, CrowdOptic combined its augmented reality technology and algorithms with Portland-based SicDrone unmanned aerial vehicles and Suspect Technology's facial recognition technologies to enable emergency responders and law enforcement with state-of-the-art surveillance and identification technology. Vice Magazine reported that the drones "fly fast, record faces in real time, recognize patterns in traffic and pinpoint people who are in the middle of an emergency."

Advertising

CrowdOptic joined with cosmetic company L'Oreal to market its products at the Luminato festival in Toronto, Ontario, Canada. L'Oreal's virtual art exhibit generated analytics that showed where people were aiming their phones.

See also
Jon Fisher
Jim Kovach
Augmented reality
Surveillance

References

Further reading
CNBC: "Google glass partner, CrowdOptic, gives sports fans a sideline view"
"Wearable tech startup CrowdOptic ready for takeoff" by Ryan Martin

External links
Official Company website
Don't write off Google Glass, says Silicon Valley CEO, inventor, entrepreneur
How CrowdOptic's Tech is Revolutionizing Sports Broadcasts, Business, & More
CNBC on CrowdOptic's use in professional sports

Software companies established in 2011
Companies based in San Francisco
Technology companies of the United States
Social information processing
Crowdsourcing
Augmented reality
Augmented reality applications
Defunct software companies of the United States
Software industry
Military technology
Eyewear companies of the United States
American companies established in 2011